Bestensee station is a railway station in Bestensee, Brandenburg, Germany.

References

Railway stations in Brandenburg
Buildings and structures in Dahme-Spreewald